The Jubilee Hospital is a community hospital in Huntly, Aberdeenshire, Scotland. It is managed by NHS Grampian.

History
The hospital, which was financed by public subscription to honour the Golden Jubilee of Queen Victoria, was designed by Robert Duncan and opened in November 1889. It served as a Red Cross hospital during the First World War. An isolation unit for treating people with tuberculosis was added in 1925 and a day case unit was added in 1938. After tuberculosis had been largely eradicated, the isolation unit was converted into a maternity unit in 1944. A health centre was added in 1965.

In August 2014 the hospital was used as a safe refuge for residents of local care homes in the wake of Hurricane Bertha.

Services
The hospital has a small x-ray department with a full-time radiographer who also provides an electrocardiography and pregnancy ultrasound scanning service. There is a 24-hour minor injury unit.

References

External links 
 
 Jubilee Hospital on the NHS inform website
 Healthcare Improvement Scotland inspection reports

NHS Grampian
NHS Scotland hospitals
Hospital buildings completed in 1888
Hospitals in Aberdeenshire
Huntly